= Janis: Her Life and Music =

2019 book by Holly George-Warren

- Author: Holly George-Warren
- Language: English
- Subject: Janis Joplin
- Publisher: Simon & Schuster
- Publication date: October 22, 2019
- Pages: 400
- ISBN: 978-1-4767-9310-8

Janis: Her Life and Music is a 2019 book by Holly George-Warren that examines the life of Janis Joplin.

== Reception ==
Sheila Weller, in The New York Times, felt that "[d]espite occasional over-density of detail", the book was a "masterfully researched" account of Joplin's life.
